The New England Stingers were a professional roller hockey team based in Portland, Maine, United States that played in Roller Hockey International.

References

Roller Hockey International teams
Sports in Portland, Maine
Sports clubs established in 1994
Ottawa Wheels
Sports clubs disestablished in 1994
1994 establishments in Maine
1994 disestablishments in Maine